Blountville is a census-designated place (CDP) in and the county seat of Sullivan County, Tennessee, United States. The population was 3,074 at the 2010 census.   It is the only Tennessee county seat not to be an incorporated city or town.

Blountville is part of the Kingsport–Bristol (TN)–Bristol (VA) Metropolitan Statistical Area, which is a component of the Johnson City–Kingsport–Bristol, TN-VA Combined Statistical Area – commonly known as the "Tri-Cities" region.

History
The area that is now Blountville is thought to have been the location of a longhunter fort prior to its permanent settlement. In 1792 Brigham gave  to Sullivan County for use as a county seat and established a hotel nearby. Blountville was laid off as a town and established as the county seat in 1795. The county's first courthouse and jail was a log structure. In 1825 it was replaced with a brick building. By 1830, the settlement had 209 residents, two churches, six stores, two taverns, ten mechanics, one doctor, and one lawyer.

On the afternoon of September 22, 1863, during the Civil War, the town was the scene of the four-hour-long Battle of Blountville. During a major expedition into East Tennessee and Southwest Virginia, a Union Army unit attacked Confederate troops at Blountville. The town was shelled in the fighting and the courthouse was burned in the battle, which forced the Confederates to withdraw. The courthouse was rebuilt within the old walls in 1866. The current courthouse dates from a major construction that was done in 1920; it also includes additions made in 1958.

If Blountville were an incorporated town, it would qualify as the second oldest municipality in Tennessee (second only to Jonesborough); however, it was unincorporated at one point in order to avoid having redundant government services for such a small area and population. This unique status has led to some odd results, including a lawsuit in which it was ruled that neighboring Kingsport was not allowed to annex areas of Sullivan County within a defined distance of the courthouse, in effect ensuring that the county seat could not be annexed out of existence.

Historic district
Several of Blountville's surviving 18th and 19th century buildings are included in an historic district listed on the National Register of Historic Places. The Deery Inn was built in the late 1700s and consists of three buildings: a two-story log home, a three-story stone house and a two-story frame building. All buildings are next to each other and attached. The home is a private residence.

Geography
Blountville is located at  (36.533312, -82.326474).

Demographics

2020 census

As of the 2020 United States census, there were 3,120 people, 1,036 households, and 683 families residing in the CDP.

2000 census
As of the census of 2000, there were 2,959 people, 1,060 households, and 763 families residing in the CDP. The population density was 518.0 people per square mile (200.1/km2). There were 1,134 housing units at an average density of 198.5 per square mile (76.7/km2). The racial makeup of the CDP was 98.01% White, 1.32% African American, 0.17% Native American, 0.20% Asian, 0.03% Pacific Islander, 0.07% from other races, and 0.20% from two or more races. Hispanic or Latino of any race were 0.88% of the population.

There were 1,060 households, out of which 25.8% had children under the age of 18 living with them, 60.0% were married couples living together, 8.8% had a female householder with no husband present, and 28.0% were non-families. 25.8% of all households were made up of individuals, and 11.3% had someone living alone who was 65 years of age or older. The average household size was 2.36 and the average family size was 2.80.

In the CDP, the population was spread out, with 16.9% under the age of 18, 10.0% from 18 to 24, 35.3% from 25 to 44, 24.9% from 45 to 64, and 12.9% who were 65 years of age or older. The median age was 38 years. For every 100 females, there were 123.0 males. For every 100 females age 18 and over, there were 127.6 males.

The median income for a household in the CDP was $37,609, and the median income for a family was $41,594. Males had a median income of $31,842 versus $18,163 for females. The per capita income for the CDP was $16,173. About 3.0% of families and 4.8% of the population were below the poverty line, including 1.4% of those under age 18 and 8.1% of those age 65 or over.

Motocross
On June 1, 2013, the Lucas Oil Pro Motocross Championship was held at Muddy Creek Raceway in Blountville. This was the first time the Pro Motocross Championship was held in the South in 15 years. The 2013 Built Ford Tough Tennessee National was the first ever Pro National held at Muddy Creek Raceway.

Education
Blountville has five public schools. The three elementary schools are Holston, Indian Springs, and Central Heights Elementary School. The new middle school is Sullivan Central Middle School. High school students attend the recently opened West Ridge High School. The community is also the site of Northeast State Community College.

Transportation
Blountville is the site of the Tri-Cities Regional Airport, located in Blountville primarily because of its central location between Johnson City, Kingsport, Bristol, TN/VA.  NASCAR champion Alan Kulwicki died in an airplane crash near Blountville.

Recreation
Blountville's historic district includes two 18th-century buildings— the Old Deery Inn and the Anderson Townhouse— and several notable 19th-century structures.  Appalachian Ghost Walks— a ghost tour company that specializes in the "haunted" history of the Appalachian Mountains— has established a ghost tour of Blountville's historic district.  The Big Hollow Par 3 Golf Course, Factory Stores of America, and Country Side Vineyard and Winery are all located in the Blountville vicinity.  Appalachian Caverns— the largest show cave in East Tennessee— and Boone Lake are located just south of Blountville.

Notable people
Joseph A. Brownlow, an itinerant farmer and father of Tennessee Governor and U.S. Senator William Gannaway Brownlow, died during 1816 in Blountville.
Ron Ramsey, 49th Lieutenant Governor of Tennessee.

References

 
Census-designated places in Sullivan County, Tennessee
Census-designated places in Tennessee
County seats in Tennessee
Kingsport–Bristol metropolitan area
Populated places established in 1792
Former municipalities in Tennessee